Peter Goodwin Fryer (1928-1999), was a male athlete who competed for England.

Athletics career
He represented England and won a gold medal in the 4 x 440 yards at the 1954 British Empire and Commonwealth Games in Vancouver, Canada.

References

1928 births
1999 deaths
English male sprinters
Athletes (track and field) at the 1954 British Empire and Commonwealth Games
Commonwealth Games medallists in athletics
Commonwealth Games gold medallists for England
Medallists at the 1954 British Empire and Commonwealth Games